Alfred George Becker was a member of the Wisconsin State Assembly.

Biography
Becker was born on August 24, 1887, in Addison, Wisconsin, the son of Philip Becker (1862–1939) and Amalia née Ferber (1866–1951). He attended high school in Hartford, Wisconsin. Later, he resided in Allenton, Wisconsin.

Career
Becker was a member of the Assembly during the 1919, 1921 and 1923 sessions. Additionally, Becker was a town chairman. He was a Republican.

References

People from Hartford, Wisconsin
Republican Party members of the Wisconsin State Assembly
Mayors of places in Wisconsin
1887 births
Year of death missing
People from Addison, Wisconsin